Myles Murphy (born January 3, 2002) is an American football defensive end for the Clemson Tigers.

Early years
Murphy attended Hillgrove High School in Powder Springs, Georgia. As a senior, he had 53 tackles and 10.5 sacks. Murphy played in the 2020 All-American Bowl. A five-star recruit, he committed to Clemson University to play college football.

College career
Murphy was an immediate contributor as a freshman at Clemson in 2020, recording seven tackles and two sacks in his first game, ending with four sacks, 41 tackles, and three forced fumbles for the season. As a sophomore in 2021, he recorded seven sacks, 38 tackles, and two forced fumbles.

References

External links
 
 Clemson Tigers bio

2002 births
Living people
Players of American football from Marietta, Georgia
American football defensive ends
Clemson Tigers football players